Bílý Kostel nad Nisou is a municipality and village in Liberec District in the Liberec Region of the Czech Republic. It has about 1,100 inhabitants.

Administrative parts
Villages of Panenská Hůrka and Pekařka are administrative parts of Bílý Kostel nad Nisou.

Gallery

References

External links

 

Villages in Liberec District